Giovanni Andrea Darif (1801–1870)  was an Italian painter, mainly of religious subjects and portraits in a Neoclassical style. He was active in Udine, Milan and the Comasco.

Biography
He was born in either Venice, to a librarian in Udine. He trained at the Accademia di Belle Arti di Venezia under Teodoro Matteini. He followed an archaic style strongly recalling Renaissance, mostly Neo-Raffaelesque  arrangements, as well as topics. He died in Milan.

References

19th-century Italian painters
Italian male painters
1801 births
1870 deaths
Painters from Venice
Accademia di Belle Arti di Venezia alumni
19th-century Italian male artists